Girls! Girls! Girls! is the fifth soundtrack album by American singer and musician Elvis Presley, released on RCA Victor Records in mono and stereo, LPM/LSP 2426, in November 1962. It accompanied the 1962 film of the same name starring Presley. Recording sessions took place at Radio Recorders in Hollywood on March 26, 27, and 28, and May 23, 1962. It peaked at number three on the Top LPs chart. It was certified Gold on August 13, 1963 by the Recording Industry Association of America.

Content
As soundtrack album sales far outstripped his regular album sales (Blue Hawaii outselling Pot Luck with Elvis by ten to one) Presley found himself firmly entrenched in songs designed for a light-entertainment formula of beautiful scenery and girls galore. With this discrepancy in sales, the formula of the soundtrack music became the focus. This formula for success would prove disastrous for Presley's career. Popular music was on the threshold of complete renewal and change and Presley would become 'lost in Hollywood'.

Sixteen songs were recorded at the sessions in March, of which thirteen were used for the soundtrack album. Banished from the kingdom after running afoul of the Colonel, songs from favored writers Jerry Leiber and Mike Stoller could only be those already written for someone else, in this case the title track being a hit for The Coasters in 1961 before being adapted for the Presley film.

The tracks "Return to Sender" and "Where Do You Come From" were issued as both sides of a single in October 1962, one month before the release of the soundtrack LP. "Return to Sender" became a substantial hit for Presley, peaking at number 2 on the Billboard Hot 100, while the b-side "Where Do You Come From" peaked at only number 99 independently of the hit side.

The songs performed by Stella Stevens in the film — "Never Let Me Go", "The Nearness Of You" and "Baby, Baby, Baby" — were in fact mimed to the singing voice of Gilda Maiken and have yet to be commercially released.

Reissues
"Girls! Girls! Girls!", "Return to Sender" and "Because of Love" made an appearance on the 1995 soundtrack compilation Command Performances: The Essential 60's Masters II. The Presley fan-club label Follow That Dream released an expanded version of the album in 2007, including alternate takes and songs recorded but not used for the soundtrack.

Legacy
The outtake "Plantation Rock" saw a performance by actor Rob Schneider (a self-proclaimed Elvis fan) on Late Night with Conan O'Brien in 1996.

Track listing

Original release

Follow That Dream reissue version

Personnel
 Elvis Presley – vocals
 The Jordanaires – vocals
 The Amigos – backing vocals (on "We'll Be Together")
 Boots Randolph – saxophone, clarinet
 Scotty Moore – electric rhythm guitar
Barney Kessel – electric lead guitar
 Tiny Timbrell – acoustic rhythm guitar
 Robert Bain – guitar (on "We'll Be Together")
Alton Hendrickson – guitar (on "We'll Be Together")
 Dudley Brooks – piano
 Harold Brown – organ (on "Thanks to the Rolling Sea")
 Ray Seigel – double bass
 D.J. Fontana – drums
Hal Blaine – drums
Bernie Mattinson – drums

References

External links

LPM-2621 Girls! Girls! Girls! Guide part of The Elvis Presley Record Research Database
LSP-2621 Girls! Girls! Girls! Guide part of The Elvis Presley Record Research Database

1962 soundtrack albums
Elvis Presley soundtracks
RCA Victor soundtracks
Comedy film soundtracks
Musical film soundtracks
Albums recorded at Radio Recorders